In Antarctica, Google Street View is available on selected locations.

 Views of Half Moon Island in the South Shetland Islands, were added September 2010.
Ceremonial South Pole, Shackleton's Hut, Discovery Hut, added July 2012.
Cape Royds, Castle Rock Loop Trail, WISSARD Test Site, Arena Valley, Lake Bonney, McMurdo Station, Taylor Valley, Bull Pass, Wright Valley, added December 2013.
South Pole Telescope, added March 2014.

References

Antarctica
Communications in Antarctica